Kewa Pueblo is a station on the New Mexico Rail Runner Express commuter rail line, located in Kewa Pueblo on Indian Service Route 88. It opened on March 22, 2010.

The station has free parking, with 40 spaces. Rio Metro Regional Transit District provides a bus connection on the Sandoval Easy Express Route 22 which connects the station with Kewa Pueblo, Cochiti Pueblo, Santa Ana Pueblo, Pena Blanca, Algodones and Bernalillo.

Each of the Rail Runner stations contains an icon to express each community's identity. The icon representing this station is the old Indian Trading Post for Kewa Pueblo. The trading post burnt down in 2001 and is now being restored, with the railroad stop being a catalyst.

References

External links
Stations, Kewa Pueblo Official Rail Runner site

Railway stations in New Mexico
Railway stations in the United States opened in 2010
Buildings and structures in Sandoval County, New Mexico
Transportation in Sandoval County, New Mexico
2010 establishments in New Mexico